Timur Selçuk (2 July 1946 – 6 November 2020) was a Turkish composer, pianist, singer and conductor.

Biography 

One of the greatest Turkish composers, Timur Selçuk was the son of Turkish neo-classical music composer Münir Nurettin Selçuk and actress Şehime Erton. His great-uncle was the Ottoman Grand Vizier Abdurrahman Nurettin Pasha. His younger brother is jazz drummer and composer Selim Selçuk. His older sister was Meral Selçuk who sang with her father in his concerts. Timur Selçuk started playing piano at the age of 5 and gave his first concert at age 7. He completed his high school education at Galatasaray High School and at Istanbul Municipal Conservatory.

Selçuk returned to Turkey after completing his study at the École Normale de Musique de Paris where he majored in composition and conducting. He became a pioneer of political songs in Turkey. With his chansons, he repeatedly stormed the hit lists. He was the founder and the conductor of the Istanbul Chamber Orchestra where he arranged compositions of Turkish and Ottoman composers including Sultan Selim the III, Hacı Arif Bey, Dilhayat Kalfa (first female composer at the Ottoman Empire). He composed a great number of music to film, theater, ballet and opera. Selçuk composed and recorded songs to some of the finest poems in Turkish literature including poetry of Ümit Yaşar Oğuzcan, Orhan Veli Kanık, Faruk Nafiz Çamlıbel and to the poems of poet Nâzım Hikmet. He studied voice for many years with the great opera singer Saadet İkesus Altan. His vocal expression was dynamic ranging from naive, to lyrical, to dramatic and theatrical. Selçuk was known for his humor and temperament on stage as well as with his courageous comments on politics.

He twice participated in the Eurovision Song Contest; in 1975, he conducted the first ever Turkish entry, "Seninle Bir Dakika", that had been composed and arranged by others. 14 years later, in 1989, he returned as composer, lyricist, arranger and conductor for "Bana Bana", that was performed by the group Pan. One of the singers of the group was his daughter Hazal Selçuk. The song finished 21st.

Timur Selçuk taught voice, music theory and piano for 40 years at his school Center for Contemporary Music (Çağdaş Müzik Merkezi) located in Istanbul. In his teachings he combined western music theory with the complex theory of classical Turkish music.

Death 
Timur Selçuk died in his sleep on 6 November 2020, in his daughter Mercan Selçuk's house.  He was buried at Zincirlikuyu Cemetery the following day.

Discography

Albums 

 Timur Selçuk ve Orkestrası, Yonce Plak, 1974
 İspanyol Meyhanesi, Philips Plak, 1974
 Timur Selçuk, Yankı Plak, 1977
 Tak Tik, Maral Plak, 1979
 İstanbul Oda Orkestrası eşliğinde; Timur Selçuk, Maral Plak, 1979
 Dünden Bugüne, Balet Plak, 1982
 Timur Selçuk – 3, Balet Plak, 1986
 Bir Uzay Masalı – Pop Opera, Balet Plak, 1991
 25. Yıl, Balet Plak, 1992
 Seçkiler, Ada Müzik, 2000
 Abdülhamit Düşerken, Balet Plak, 2004
 Babamın Şarkıları, Balet Plak, 2004
 Bedreddin, Balet Plak, 2005

45 records 

 Ayrılanlar İçin – On Dit, Barclay Plak, 1964
 İnme – Çoban Çeşmesi, Balet Plak, 1969
 Derbeder Ömrüm – Köylü Kızı, Philips Plak, 1970
 Böyledir Akşamları İstanbul'un – Rıhtımda, Philips Plak, 1970
 Viens Regarder Le Soleil, Philips Plak, 1971
 Bugün Yarın Daima – Kadın Kadın, Philips Plak, 1972
 Yaşayamam Sensiz – Sevmek Delilik, Philips Plak, 1972 – 1974
 İspanyol Meyhanesi – Beyaz Güvercin, Philips Plak, 1972
 Duyar mısın? – Kara Sevda, Grafson Plak, 1972
 Sıla Güneşi – Ben Gamlı Hazan Sense Taze Bahar, Yonca Plak, 1972
 Kırık Kalpler – Oy Be Nenem, Yonca Plak, 1973
 Panayır Günü – Yaralı Ceylan, Yonca Plak, 1973
 Sen Nerdesin – Tu Seras Un Concerto, Barclay Plak, 1974
 Hürriyete Doğru – Karantinalı Despina, Grafson Plak, 1974
 Pireli Şarkı – Memet, Yonca Plak, 1975
 Dönek Türküsü – Özgürlük, Yankı Plak, 1978

Filmography 

 Eine Saison in Hakkari, (Turkey/Germany), 1982/1983 directed by Erden Kıral
 Vatanyolu (Die Heimreise), (Germany), 1987/1988 by Enis Günay, Rasim Konyar
 Mavi Sürgün (Das blaue Exil), (Turkey/Germany/Greece), 1992/1993 by Erden Kıral

References 

  Timur Selçuk's biography
  Full discography

External links 

 
 
 Timur Selçuk Personal and Professional Homepage http://www.timurselcuk.net/

1946 births
2020 deaths
Musicians from Istanbul
Turkish composers
Turkish pianists
Best Music Score Golden Boll Award winners
Best Music Score Golden Orange Award winners
Galatasaray High School alumni
Burials at Zincirlikuyu Cemetery
Eurovision Song Contest conductors